William L. Reed may refer to:
 William Reed (composer) (William Leonard Reed, 1910–2002), English classical composer and pianist
 William L. Reed (politician) (1866–?), served in the Massachusetts House of Representatives